Saint-Jean-lès-Longuyon (literally Saint-Jean near Longuyon) is a commune in the Meurthe-et-Moselle department in north-eastern France.

Geography
The village lies on the right bank of the Othain, which forms all of the commune's western border.

See also
Communes of the Meurthe-et-Moselle department

References

Saintjeanleslonguyon